Optical molasses is a laser cooling technique that can cool neutral atoms to temperatures lower than a magneto-optical trap (MOT). An optical molasses consists of 3 pairs of counter-propagating circularly polarized laser beams intersecting in the region where the atoms are present. The main difference between optical molasses and a MOT is the absence of magnetic field in the former. Therefore, unlike a MOT, an optical molasses provides only cooling and no trapping. While a typical Sodium MOT can cool atoms down to 300μK, optical molasses can cool the atoms down to 40μK, an order of magnitude colder.

History

When laser cooling was proposed in 1975, a theoretical limit on the lowest possible temperature was predicted. Known as the Doppler limit, this was given by the lowest possible temperature attainable considering the cooling of two-level atoms by Doppler cooling and the heating of atoms due to momentum diffusion from the scattering of laser photons.  Here, is the natural line-width of the atomic transition, is the reduced Planck constant and, is the Boltzmann constant.

Experiments at the National Institute of Standards and Technology, Gaithersburg, found the temperature of cooled atoms to be well below the theoretical limit. Initially, it was a surprise to theorists, until the full explanation came out.

In 1985, Chu et al. directed a thermal beam of sodium atoms through an optical molasses region formed by counter-propagating light from a frequency-doubled Neodymium:YAlG laser. They measured the average temperature by quickly shutting off the beams and measuring the fluorescence of the released atoms.

Theory
The best explanation of the phenomenon of optical molasses is based on the principle of polarization gradient cooling. Counterpropagating beams of circularly polarized light cause a standing wave, where the light polarization is linear but the direction rotates along the direction of the beams at a very fast rate. Atoms moving in the spatially varying linear polarisation have a higher probability density of being in a state that is more susceptible to absorption of light from the beam coming head-on, rather than the beam from behind. This results in a velocity dependent damping force that is able to reduce the velocity of a cloud of atoms to near the recoil limit.

See also 

 Gray molasses

References

Atomic, molecular, and optical physics